Interstate 44 (I-44) in the US state of Missouri runs northeast from the Oklahoma state line near Joplin to I-70 in Downtown St. Louis.

Route description

The first interchange in Missouri is the eastern terminus of both U.S. Route 166 (US 166) and US 400. This highway next goes through southern Joplin and then begins to run concurrently with I-49/US 71 at exit 11 just after entering Jasper County. The freeway turns to a more eastern heading (the old route of US 166), and then I-49/US 71 splits off to the north at exit 18.

I-44 next enters Lawrence County. Near Mount Vernon, the highway curves to the northeast. The section of highway to Halltown is a completely new highway, not supplanting any previous highways. At Halltown, the road curves back to due east, beginning to follow the general pathway of old US 66, which it does all the way to downtown St. Louis. I-44 then goes around the western and northern sides of Springfield, serving as the western terminus of the James River Freeway, as well as crossing both Route 13 and US 65. The Interstate Highway continues northeast, bypassing Lebanon.

In Pulaski County, I-44 enters the Mark Twain National Forest and then leaves it to provide access to Waynesville, St. Robert, and Fort Leonard Wood before reentering the national forest. The freeway leaves the forest in Phelps County west of Rolla. I-44 then goes through Rolla, where it meets US 63. It continues its northeastern course, passing near St. James, Cuba, Bourbon, Sullivan, and Saint Clair. At this point, it roughly parallels the Meramec River.

I-44 next goes north of Pacific before moving into St. Louis County. I-44 then bisects Eureka before serving as the southern boundary of Route 66 State Park (the former site of Times Beach, known for its dioxin contamination and its eventual demolition and Superfund cleanup). I-44 then runs across unincorporated land before entering Fenton and meeting an interchange with I-270 in Sunset Hills. I-44 then goes through Crestwood, Kirkwood, Oakland, Webster Groves, and Shrewsbury before entering the city of St. Louis. I-44 runs on a due east course through St. Louis until it meets I-55 south of downtown. The two highways run concurrently for about  until I-55 turns east at an interchange with I-64 to cross the Mississippi River on the Poplar Street Bridge. I-44 then continues north through Downtown St. Louis on the former route of I-70 to its junction with that highway at the Stan Musial Veterans Memorial Bridge; drivers wishing to access eastbound I-70 must cross the Poplar Street Bridge via I-55 and I-64.

History

I-44 follows the general route of, and completely replaced, historic US 66 from Halltown (exit 58, the junction with a cutoff section of US 66 since renumbered as Route 96) to downtown St. Louis. From rural Joplin at exit 15 to Mount Vernon at exit 49, it largely follows a decommissioned section of US 166.

The eastern terminus of I-44 was changed when the Stan Musial Veterans Memorial Bridge opened in February 2014, rerouting I-70 over the river along a more northern alignment. I-44 now takes the old I-70 alignment through the below-grade section of roadway in St. Louis, making the new eastern terminus a directional interchange with I-70 near Cass Avenue; the eastbound lanes of I-44 join the westbound lanes of I-70, and the westbound lanes of I-44 branch off the eastbound lanes of I-70.

Exit list

Business loops

All of I-44's business routes are in Missouri. Most of these business loops were the former US 66. Missouri also has the unusual occurrence of a business loop and business spur from the same Interstate intersecting (the Waynesville–St. Robert loop and the Ft. Leonard Wood spur).

References

External links

44
 Missouri
U.S. Route 66 in Missouri
Transportation in Newton County, Missouri
Transportation in Jasper County, Missouri
Transportation in Lawrence County, Missouri
Transportation in Greene County, Missouri
Transportation in Webster County, Missouri
Transportation in Laclede County, Missouri
Transportation in Pulaski County, Missouri
Transportation in Phelps County, Missouri
Transportation in Crawford County, Missouri
Transportation in Franklin County, Missouri
Transportation in St. Louis County, Missouri
Roads in St. Louis